This is a list of singles that charted in the top ten of the ARIA Charts in 2019. In 2019, twenty-three acts reached the top ten for the first time.

Top-ten singles

Key

2018 peaks

2020 peaks 

Notes:
The singles re-entered the top 10 on 7 January 2019.
The singles re-entered the top 10 on 4 February 2019.
The single re-entered the top 10 on 18 February 2019.
The singles re-entered the top 10 on 8 April 2019.
The single re-entered the top 10 on 15 April 2019.
The single re-entered the top 10 on 20 May 2019.
The single re-entered the top 10 on 27 May 2019.
The single re-entered the top 10 on 10 June 2019.
The single re-entered the top 10 on 17 June 2019.
The single re-entered the top 10 on 22 July 2019.
The single re-entered the top 10 on 29 July 2019.
The single re-entered the top 10 on 19 August 2019.
The singles re-entered the top 10 on 16 September 2019.
The single re-entered the top 10 on 23 September 2019.
The single re-entered the top 10 on 28 October 2019.
The single re-entered the top 10 on 11 November 2019.
The single re-entered the top 10 on 16 December 2019.
The single re-entered the top 10 on 23 December 2019.
The single re-entered the top 10 on 30 December 2019.

Entries by artist
The following table shows artists who achieved two or more top 10 entries in 2019, including songs that reached their peak in 2018 and 2020. The figures include both main artists and featured artists. The total number of weeks an artist spent in the top ten in 2019 is also shown.

See also
2019 in music
ARIA Charts
List of number-one singles of 2019 (Australia)

References 

Australia Singles Top 10
Top 10 singles
Top 10 singles 2019
Australia 2019